Dawid Pożak (born 15 June 1992) is a Polish footballer who plays as a midfielder for Lublinianka Lublin. He has previously played for Lewart Lubartów, Wisła Puławy, and Motor Lublin.

Club career
Pożak began his career at Lewart Lubartów. He spent three-and-a-half seasons at Lewart before moving to Wisła Puławy in February 2012. He made his professional debut on 14 March 2013 in a 0–0 draw with Stal Rzeszów. On 16 May 2012, he scored his first goal for the club in the 1–0 win against Pelikan Łowicz.

On 30 July 2016, Pożak made his I liga debut against MKS Kluczbork, coming on as a substitute in the 75th minute. In the 2016–17 I liga season, he played in 28 league games, scoring 2 goals. During his six-and-a-half years at Wisła, Pożak made 147 league appearances, scoring eleven goals.

On 13 July 2018, he signed a contract with Motor Lublin. In July 2019, he joined IV liga side Lewart Lubartów.

References

External links
 

1992 births
Wisła Puławy players
Motor Lublin players
I liga players
II liga players
III liga players
IV liga players
Association football midfielders
Living people
Polish footballers